The Butiaba naked-tailed shrew (Crocidura littoralis) is a species of mammal in the family Soricidae. It is found in Cameroon, Central African Republic, Republic of the Congo, Democratic Republic of the Congo, Kenya, and Uganda. Its natural habitat is subtropical or tropical moist lowland forests.

References
 Hutterer, R. 2004.  Crocidura littoralis.   2006 IUCN Red List of Threatened Species.   Downloaded on 30 July 2007.

Crocidura
Mammals described in 1910
Taxonomy articles created by Polbot
Taxa named by Edmund Heller